Rhododendron (from Ancient Greek  rhódon "rose" and  déndron "tree") is a very large genus of about 1,024 species of woody plants in the heath family (Ericaceae). They can be either evergreen or deciduous. Most species are native to eastern Asia and the Himalayan region, but smaller numbers occur elsewhere in Asia, and in North America, Europe and Australia. It is the national flower of Nepal, the state flower of Washington and West Virginia in the United States, the state flower of Nagaland in India, the provincial flower of Jiangxi in China and the state tree of Sikkim and Uttarakhand in India. Most species have brightly colored flowers which bloom from late winter through to early summer.

Azaleas make up two subgenera of Rhododendron. They are distinguished from "true" rhododendrons by having only five anthers per flower.

Species

Description

They may be either evergreen or deciduous. In some species, the undersides of the leaves are covered with scales (lepidote) or hairs (indumentum). Some of the best known species are noted for their many clusters of large flowers. There are alpine species with small flowers and small leaves, and tropical species such as section Vireya that often grow as epiphytes. Species in this genus may be part of the heath complex in oak-heath forests in eastern North America.

They have frequently been divided based on the presence or absence of scales on the abaxial (lower) leaf surface (lepidote or elepidote). These scales, unique to subgenus Rhododendron, are modified hairs consisting of a polygonal scale attached by a stalk.

Rhododendron are characterised by having inflorescences with scarious (dry) perulae, a chromosome number of x=13, fruit that has a septicidal capsule, an ovary that is superior (or nearly so), stamens that have no appendages, and agglutinate (clumped) pollen.

Taxonomy

Rhododendron is the largest genus in the family Ericaceae, with over 1000 species,  (though estimates vary from 850 to 1200) and is morphologically diverse. Consequently, the taxonomy has been historically complex.

Early history 
Although Rhododendrons had been known since the description of Rhododendron hirsutum by Charles de l'Écluse (Clusius) in the sixteenth century, and were known to classical writers (Magor 1990), and referred to as Chamaerhododendron (low-growing rose tree), the genus was first formally described by Linnaeus in his Species Plantarum in 1753. He listed five species under Rhododendron (Rhododendron ferrugineum (type species), R. dauricum, R. hirsutum, R. chamaecistus (now Rhodothamnus chamaecistus (L.) Rchb.) and R. maximum). At that time he considered the then known six species of Azalea that he had described earlier in 1735 in his Systema Naturae as a separate genus.

Linnaeus' six species of Azalea were Azalea indica, A. pontica, A. lutea, A. viscosa, A. lapponica and A. procumbens (now Kalmia procumbens), which he distinguished from Rhododendron by having five stamens, as opposed to ten. As new species of what are now considered Rhododendron were discovered, they were assigned to separate genera if they seemed to differ significantly from the type species. For instance Rhodora (Linnaeus 1763) for Rhododendron canadense, Vireya (Blume 1826) and Hymenanthes (Blume 1826) for Rhododendron metternichii, now R. degronianum. Meanwhile, other botanists such as Salisbury (1796) and Tate (1831) began to question the distinction between Azalea and Rhododendron, and finally in 1836, Azalea was incorporated into Rhododendron and the genus divided into eight sections. Of these Tsutsutsi (Tsutsusi), Pentanthera, Pogonanthum, Ponticum and Rhodora are still used, the other sections being Lepipherum, Booram, and Chamaecistus. This structure largely survived till recently (2004), following which the development of molecular phylogeny led to major re-examinations of traditional morphological classifications, although other authors such as Candolle, who described six sections, used slightly different numeration.

Soon, as more species became available in the nineteenth century so did a better understanding of the characteristics necessary for the major divisions. Chief amongst these were Maximovicz's Rhododendreae Asiae Orientali and Planchon. Maximovicz used flower bud position and its relationship with leaf buds to create eight "Sections". Bentham and Hooker used a similar scheme, but called the divisions "Series". It was not until 1893 that Koehne appreciated the significance of scaling and hence the separation of lepidote and elepidote species. The large number of species that were available by the early twentieth century prompted a new approach when Balfour introduced the concept of grouping species into series. The Species of Rhododendron referred to this series concept as the Balfourian system. That system continued up to modern times in Davidian's four volume The Rhododendron Species.

Modern era
The next major attempt at classification was by Sleumer who from 1934 began incorporating the Balfourian series into the older hierarchical structure of subgenera and sections, according to the International Code of Botanical Nomenclature, culminating in 1949 with his "Ein System der Gattung Rhododendron L.", and subsequent refinements. Most of the Balfourian series are represented by Sleumer as subsections, though some appear as sections or even subgenera. Sleumer based his system on the relationship of the flower buds to the leaf buds, habitat, flower structure, and whether the leaves were lepidote or non-lepidote. While Sleumer's work was widely accepted, many in the United States and the United Kingdom continued to use the simpler Balfourian system of the Edinburgh group.

Sleumer's system underwent many revisions by others, predominantly the Edinburgh group in their continuing Royal Botanic Garden Edinburgh notes. Cullen of the Edinburgh group, placing more emphasis on the lepidote characteristics of the leaves, united all of the lepidote species into subgenus Rhododendron, including four of Sleumer's subgenera (Rhododendron, Pseudoazalea, Pseudorhodorastrum, Rhodorastrum). In 1986 Philipson & Philipson raised two sections of subgenus Aleastrum (Mumeazalea, Candidastrum) to subgenera, while reducing genus Therorhodion to a subgenus of Rhododendron. In 1987 Spethmann, adding phytochemical features proposed a system with fifteen subgenera grouped into three 'chorus' subgenera.

A number of closely related genera had been included together with Rhododendron in a former tribe, Rhodoreae. These have been progressively incorporated into Rhododendron. Chamberlain and Rae moved the monotypic section Tsusiopsis together with the monotypic genus Tsusiophyllum into section Tsutsusi, while Kron & Judd reduced genus Ledum to a subsection of section Rhododendron. Then Judd & Kron moved two species (Rhododendron schlippenbachii, R. quinquefolium) from section Brachybachii, subgenus Tsutsusi and two from section Rhodora, subgenus Pentanthera (R. albrechtii, R. pentaphyllum) into section Sciadorhodion, subgenus Pentanthera. Finally Chamberlain brought the various systems together in 1996, with 1,025 species divided into eight subgenera. For a comparison of the Sleumer and Chamberlain schemata see Table 1 of Goetsch (2005).

Phylogenetic analyses

The era of molecular analysis rather than descriptive features can be dated to the work of Kurashige (1988) and Kron (1997) who used matK sequencing. Later Gao et al. (2002) used ITS sequences to determine a cladistic analysis. They confirmed that the genus Rhododendron was monophyletic, with subgenus Therorhodion in the basal position, consistent with the matK studies. Following publication of the studies of Goetsch et al. (2005) with RPB2, there began an ongoing realignment of species and groups within the genus, based on evolutionary relationships. Their work was more supportive of Sleumer's original system than the later modifications introduced by Chamberlain et al..

The major finding of Goetsch and colleagues was that all species examined (except R. camtschaticum, subgenus Therorhodion) formed three major clades which they labelled A, B and C, with the subgenera Rhododendron and Hymenanthes nested within clades A and B as monophyletic groups respectively. By contrast subgenera Azaleastrum and Pentanthera were polyphyletic, while R. camtschaticum appeared as a sister to all other rhododendrons. The small polyphyletic subgenera Pentanthera and Azaleastrum were divided between two clades. The four sections of Pentanthera between clades B and C, with two each, while Azaleastrum had one section in each of A and C.

Thus subgenera Azaleastrum and Pentanthera needed to be disassembled, and Rhododendron, Hymenanthes and Tsutsusi correspondingly expanded. In addition to the two separate genera included under Rhododendron by Chamberlain (Ledum, Tsusiophyllum), Goetsch et al.. added Menziesia (Clade C). Despite a degree of paraphyly, the subgenus Rhododendron was otherwise untouched with regard to its three sections but four other subgenera were eliminated and one new subgenus created, leaving a total of five subgenera in all, from eight in Chamberlain's scheme. The discontinued subgenera are Pentanthera, Tsutsusi, Candidastrum and Mumeazalea, while a new subgenus was created by elevating subgenus Azaleastrum section Choniastrum to subgenus rank.

Subgenus Pentanthera (deciduous azaleas) with its four sections was dismembered by eliminating two sections and redistributing the other two between the existing subgenera in clades B (Hymenanthes) and C (Azaleastrum), although the name was retained in section Pentanthera (14 species) which was moved to subgenus Hymenanthes. Of the remaining three sections, monotypic Viscidula was discontinued by moving Rhododendron nipponicum to Tsutsusi (C), while Rhodora (2 species) was itself polyphyletic and was broken up by moving Rhododendron canadense to section Pentanthera (B) and Rhododendron vaseyi to section Sciadorhodion, which then became a new section of subgenus Azaleastrum (C).

Subgenus Tsutsusi (C) was reduced to section status retaining the name, and included in subgenus Azaleastrum. Of the three minor subgenera, all in C, two were discontinued. The single species of monotypic subgenus Candidastrum (Rhododendron albiflorum) was moved to subgenus Azaleastrum, section Sciadorhodion. Similarly the single species in monotypic subgenus Mumeazalea (Rhododendron semibarbatum) was placed in the new section Tsutsusi, subgenus Azaleastrum. Genus Menziesa (9 species) was also added to section Sciadorhodion. The remaining small subgenus Therorhodion with its two species was left intact. Thus two subgenera, Hymenanthes and Azaleastrum were expanded at the expense of four subgenera that were eliminated, although Azaleastrum lost one section (Choniastrum) as a new subgenus, since it was a distinct subclade in A. In all, Hymenanthes increased from one to two sections, while Azaleastrum, by losing one section and gaining two increased from two to three sections. (See schemata under Subgenera) (Table 1.)

Subsequent research has supported the revision by Goetsch, although has largely concentrated on further defining the phylogeny within the subdivisions. In 2011 the two species of Diplarche were also added to Rhododendron, incertae sedis.

Subdivision
This genus has been progressively subdivided into a hierarchy of subgenus, section, subsection, and species.

Subgenera
Terminology from the Sleumer (1949) system is frequently found in older literature, with five subgenera and is as follows;
 Subgenus Lepidorrhodium Koehne: Lepidotes. 3 sections
 Subgenus Eurhododendron Maxim.: Elipidotes. 
 Subgenus Pseudanthodendron Sleumer: Deciduous azaleas. 3 sections
 Subgenus Anthodendron Rehder & Wilson: Evergreen azaleas. 3 sections
 Subgenus Azaleastrum Planch.: 4 sections

In the later traditional classification, attributed to Chamberlain (1996), and as used by horticulturalists and the American Rhododendron Society, Rhododendron has eight subgenera based on morphology, namely the presence of scales (lepidote), deciduousness of leaves, and the floral and vegetative branching patterns, after Sleumer (1980). These consist of four large and four small subgenera. The first two subgenera (Rhododendron and Hymenanthes) represent the species commonly considered as 'Rhododendrons'. The next two smaller subgenera (Pentanthera and Tsutsusi) represent the 'Azaleas'. The remaining four subgenera contain very few species. The largest of these is subgenus Rhododendron, containing nearly half of all known species and all of the lepidote species.

Subgenus Rhododendron : Small leaf or lepidotes (scales on the underside of the leaves). 3 sections, 462 species, type species: Rhododendron ferrugineum.
Subgenus Hymenanthes : Large leaf or elepidotes (without scales). 1 section, 224 species, type Rhododendron degronianum.
Subgenus Pentanthera : Deciduous azaleas. 4 sections, 23 species, type Rhododendron luteum.
Subgenus Tsutsusi : Evergreen azaleas. 2 sections, 80 species, type Rhododendron indicum.
Subgenus Azaleastrum : 2 sections, 16 species, type Rhododendron ovatum.
Subgenus Candidastrum : 1 species, Rhododendron albiflorum.
Subgenus Mumeazalea : 1 species, Rhododendron semibarbatum.
Subgenus Therorhodion : 2 species (Rhododendron camtschaticum, Rhododendron redowskianun).

For a comparison of the Sleumer and Chamberlain systems, see Goetsch et al. (2005) Table 1.

This division was based on a number of what were thought to be key morphological characteristics. These included the position of the inflorescence buds (terminal or lateral), whether lepidote or elepidote, deciduousness of leaves, and whether new foliage was derived from axils from previous year's shoots or the lowest scaly leaves (Table 2.).

Following the cladistic analysis of Goetsch et al. (2005) this scheme was simplified, based on the discovery of three major clades (A, B, C) as follows.

Clade A
 Subgenus Rhododendron : Small leaf or lepidotes (scales on the underside of the leaves). 3 sections, about 400 species, type species: Rhododendron ferrugineum.
 Subgenus Choniastrum : 11 species
Clade B
 Subgenus Hymenanthes : Large leaf or elepidotes (without scales), including deciduous azaleas. 2 sections, about 140–225 species, type Rhododendron degronianum.
Clade C
 Subgenus Azaleastrum : Evergreen azaleas. 3 sections, about 120 species, type Rhododendron ovatum.
Sister taxon
 Subgenus Therorhodion : 2 species (Rhododendron camtschaticum, Rhododendron redowskianun).

Sections and subsections 
The larger subgenera are further subdivided into sections and subsections Some subgenera contain only a single section, and some sections only a single subsection. Shown here is the traditional classification, with species number after Chamberlain (1996), but this scheme is undergoing constant revision. Revisions by Goetsch et al. (2005) and by Craven et al. (2008) shown in (parenthetical italics). Older ranks such as Series (groups of species) are no longer used but may be found in the literature, but the American Rhododendron Society still uses a similar device, called Alliances

Subgenus Rhododendron L. (3 sections, 462 species: increased to five sections in 2008)
(Discovereya (Sleumer) Argent, raised from Vireya)
Pogonathum Aitch. & Hemsl. (13 species; Himalaya and adjacent mountains)
(Pseudovireya (C.B.Clarke) Argent, raised from Vireya)
Rhododendron L. (149 species in 25 subsections; temperate to subarctic Northern Hemisphere)
Vireya (Blume) Copel.f. (300 species in 2 subsections; tropical southeast Asia, Australasia. At one time considered separate subgenus)
Subgenus Hymenanthes (Blume) K.Koch (1 section, 224 species) (Increased to two sections)
Ponticum  (24 subsections)
(Pentanthera  (2 subsections – new section, moved from subgenus Pentanthera)
Subgenus Pentanthera  (4 sections, 23 species) (Discontinued)
Pentanthera  (2 subsections – moved to subgenus Hymenanthes)
Rhodora (L.) G. Don (2 species; Rhododendron canadense, Rhododendron vaseyi) (Discontinued, redistributed)
Sciadorhodion Rehder & Wilson (4 species) (Moved to subgenus Azaleastrum)
Viscidula Matsum. & Nakai (1 species; Rhododendron nipponicum) (Discontinued, added to section Tsutsusi, subgenus Azaleastrum)
Subgenus Tsutsusi (Sweet) Pojarkova (2 sections, 80 species) (Discontinued, reduced to section and moved to subgenus Azaleastrum)
Brachycalyx Sweet (3 alliances, 15 species)
Tsutsusi (Sweet) Pojarkova (65 species)
Subgenus Azaleastrum Planch. (2 sections, 16 species) (Increased to three sections)
Azaleastrum Planch. (5 species)
(Choniastrum Franch. (11 species) (Raised to subgenus))
(Sciadorhodion Rehder & Wilson (4 species) (Moved from subgenus Pentanthera))
(Tsutsusi (Sweet) Pojarkova (reduced from subgenus))
Subgenus Candidastrum Franch. (1 species: Rhododendron albiflorum) (Discontinued, moved to section Sciadorhodion, subgenus Azaleastrum)
Subgenus Mumeazalea (Sleumer) W.R. Philipson & M.N. Philipson (1 species: Rhododendron semibarbatum) (Discontinued, moved to section Tsutsusi, subgenus Azaleastrum)
Subgenus Therorhodion A. Gray (2 species)
(Subgenus Choniastrum Franch. (11 species))

Distribution and habitat 

Species of the genus Rhododendron are widely distributed between latitudes 80°N and 20°S and are native to areas from North America to Europe, Russia, and Asia, and from Greenland to Queensland, Australia and the Solomon Islands. The centres of diversity are in the Himalayas and Malaysia, with the greatest species diversity in the Sino-Himalayan region, Southwest China and northern Burma, from India – Himachal Pradesh, Uttarakhand, Sikkim and Nagaland to Nepal, northwestern Yunnan and western Sichuan and southeastern Tibet. Other significant areas of diversity are in the mountains of Korea, Japan and Taiwan. More than 90% of Rhododendron sensu Chamberlain belong to the Asian subgenera Rhododendron, Hymenanthes and section Tsutsusi. Of the first two of these, the species are predominantly found in the area of the Himalayas and Southwest China (Sino-Himalayan Region).

The 300 tropical species within the Vireya section of subgenus Rhododendron occupy the Malay archipelago from their presumed Southeast Asian origin to Northern Australia, with 55 known species in Borneo and 164 in New Guinea. The species in New Guinea are native to subalpine moist grasslands at around 3,000 metres above sea level in the Central Highlands. Subgenera Rhododendron and Hymenanthes, together with section Pentanthera of subgenus Pentanthera are also represented to a lesser degree in the Mountainous areas of North America and Western Eurasia. Subgenus Tsutsusi is found in the maritime regions of East Asia (Japan, Korea, Taiwan, East China), but not in North America or Eurasia.

In the United States, native Rhododendron mostly occur in lowland and montane forests in the Pacific Northwest, California, the Northeast, and the Appalachian Mountains.

Ecology

Invasive species
Rhododendron ponticum has become invasive in Ireland and the United Kingdom. It is an introduced species, spreading in woodland areas and replacing the natural understory. R. ponticum is difficult to eradicate, as its roots can make new shoots.

Insects
A number of insects either target rhododendrons or will opportunistically attack them. Rhododendron borers and various weevils are major pests of rhododendrons, and many caterpillars will preferentially devour them.

Rhododendron species are used as food plants by the larvae (caterpillars) of some butterflies and moths; see List of Lepidoptera that feed on rhododendrons.

Diseases

Major diseases include Phytophthora root rot, stem and twig fungal dieback.

Rhododendron bud blast, a fungal condition that causes buds to turn brown and dry before they can open, is caused by the fungus Pycnostysanus azaleae, which may be brought to the plant by the rhododendron leafhopper, Graphocephala fennahi.

Cultivation

Both species and hybrid rhododendrons (including azaleas) are used extensively as ornamental plants in landscaping in many parts of the world, including both temperate and subtemperate regions. Many species and cultivars are grown commercially for the nursery trade.

Rhododendrons can be propagated by air layering or stem cuttings. They can self-propagate by sending up shoots from the roots. Sometimes an attached branch that has drooped to the ground will root in damp mulch, and the resulting rooted plant then can be cut off the parent rhododendron.

Rhododendrons are often valued in landscaping for their structure, size, flowers, and the fact that many of them are evergreen. Azaleas are frequently used around foundations and occasionally as hedges, and many larger-leafed rhododendrons lend themselves well to more informal plantings and woodland gardens, or as specimen plants.

Commercial growing
Rhododendrons are grown commercially in many areas for sale, and are occasionally collected in the wild, a practice now rare in most areas. Larger commercial growers often ship long distances; in the United States, most of them are on the west coast (Oregon, Washington state and California). Large-scale commercial growing often selects for different characteristics than hobbyist growers might want, such as resistance to root rot when overwatered, ability to be forced into budding early, ease of rooting or other propagation, and saleability.

Horticultural divisions
Horticulturally, rhododendrons may be divided into the following groups:
 Evergreen rhododendrons - large group of evergreen shrubs that vary greatly in size. Most rhododendron flowers are bell-shaped and have 10 stamens.
 Vireya (Malesian) rhododendrons: epiphytic tender shrubs
 Azaleas – group of shrubs which have smaller and thinner leaves than evergreen rhododendrons. They are generally medium-sized shrubs with smaller funnel-shaped flowers that usually have 5 stamens:
 Deciduous hybrid azaleas:
 Exbury hybrids – derived from the Knap Hill hybrids, developed by Lionel de Rothschild at the Exbury Estate in England.
 Ghent (Gandavense) hybrids – Belgian raised
 Knap Hill hybrids – developed by Anthony Waterer at the Knap Hill Nursery in England.
 Mollis hybrids – Dutch and Belgian raised
 New Zealand Ilam hybrids – derived from Knap Hill/Exbury hybrids
 Occidentale hybrids – English raised
 Rustica Flore Pleno hybrids – sweet-scented, double-flowered
 Evergreen hybrid azaleas:
 Gable hybrids – raised by Joseph B. Gable in Pennsylvania.
 Glenn Dale hybrids – US raised complex hybrids
 Indian (Indica) hybrids – mostly of Belgian origin
 Kaempferi hybrids – Dutch raised
 Kurume hybrids – Japanese raised
 Kyushu hybrids – very hardy Japanese azaleas (to −30 °C)
 Oldhamii hybrids – dwarf hybrids raised at Exbury, England
 Satsuki hybrids – Japanese raised, originally for bonsai
 Shammarello hybrids – raised in northern Ohio
 Vuyk (Vuykiana) hybrids – raised in the Netherlands
 Azaleodendrons – semi-evergreen hybrids between deciduous azaleas and rhododendrons

Planting and care

Like other ericaceous plants, most rhododendrons prefer acid soils with a pH of roughly 4.5–5.5; some tropical Vireyas and a few other rhododendron species grow as epiphytes and require a planting mix similar to orchids. Rhododendrons have fibrous roots and prefer well-drained soils high in organic material. In areas with poorly drained or alkaline soils, rhododendrons are often grown in raised beds using media such as composted pine bark. Mulching and careful watering are important, especially before the plant is established.

A new calcium-tolerant stock of rhododendrons (trademarked as 'Inkarho') has been exhibited at the RHS Chelsea Flower Show in London (2011). Individual hybrids of rhododendrons have been grafted on to a rootstock on a single rhododendron plant that was found growing in a chalk quarry. The rootstock is able to grow in calcium-rich soil up to a pH of 7.5.

Hybrids
Rhododendrons are extensively hybridized in cultivation, and natural hybrids often occur in areas where species ranges overlap. There are over 28,000 cultivars of Rhododendron in the International Rhododendron Registry held by the Royal Horticultural Society. Most have been bred for their flowers, but a few are of garden interest because of ornamental leaves and some for ornamental bark or stems. Some hybrids have fragrant flowers—such as the Loderi hybrids, created by crossing Rhododendron fortunei and R. griffithianum. Other examples include the PJM hybrids, formed from a cross between Rhododendron carolinianum and R. dauricum, and named after Peter J. Mezitt of Weston Nurseries, Massachusetts.

Uses

Pharmacology
Rhododendron species have long been used in traditional medicine. Animal studies and in vitro research have identified possible anti-inflammatory and hepatoprotective activities which may be due to the antioxidant effects of flavonoids or other phenolic compounds and saponins the plant contains. Xiong et al. have found that the root of the plant is able to reduce the activity of NF-κB in rats.

Toxicology

Some species of rhododendron are poisonous to grazing animals because of a toxin called grayanotoxin in their pollen and nectar. People have been known to become ill from eating honey made by bees feeding on rhododendron and azalea flowers. Xenophon described the odd behaviour of Greek soldiers after having consumed honey in a village surrounded by Rhododendron ponticum during the march of the Ten Thousand in 401 BCE. Pompey's soldiers reportedly suffered lethal casualties following the consumption of honey made from Rhododendron deliberately left behind by Pontic forces in 67 BCE during the Third Mithridatic War. Later, it was recognized that honey resulting from these plants has a slightly hallucinogenic and laxative effect. The suspect rhododendrons are Rhododendron ponticum and Rhododendron luteum (formerly Azalea pontica), both found in northern Asia Minor. Eleven similar cases during the 1980s have been documented in Istanbul, Turkey. Rhododendron is extremely toxic to horses, with some animals dying within a few hours of ingesting the plant, although most horses tend to avoid it if they have access to good forage. The effects of R. ponticum were mentioned in the 2009 film Sherlock Holmes as a proposed way to arrange a fake execution. It was also mentioned in the third episode of Season 2 of BBC's Sherlock, speculated to have been a part of Sherlock's fake death scheme.

Culture

Symbolism

In the language of flowers, the Rhododendron symbolizes danger and to beware.

Rhododendron arboreum (lali guransh) is the national flower of Nepal. R. ponticum is the state flower of Indian-administered Kashmir and Pakistan-controlled Kashmir. Rhododendron niveum is the state tree of Sikkim in India.  Rhododendron arboreum is also the state tree of the state of Uttarakhand, India. Pink Rhododendron (Rhododendron campanulatum) is the state flower of Himachal Pradesh, India. Rhododendron is also the provincial flower of Jiangxi, China and the state flower of Nagaland, the 16th state of the Indian Union.

Rhododendron maximum, the most widespread rhododendron of the Appalachian Mountains, is the state flower of the US state of West Virginia, and is in the Flag of West Virginia.

Rhododendron macrophyllum, a widespread rhododendron of the Pacific Northwest, is the state flower of the US state of Washington.

Literature
The nineteenth-century American poet and essayist Ralph Waldo Emerson in 1834 wrote a poem titled "The Rhodora, On Being Asked, Whence Is the Flower",
In Joyce's Ulysses, rhododendrons play an important role in Leopold and Molly's early courtship: Molly remembers them in her soliloquy – "the sun shines for you he said the day we were lying among the rhododendrons on Howth head in the grey tweed suit and his straw hat the day I got him to propose to me". Jasper Fforde a British author, also uses rhododendron as a motif throughout many of his published books. See Thursday Next series, and Shades of Grey.
Amongst the Zomi tribes in India and Myanmar, "Rhododendrons" called "Ngeisok" is used in a poetic manner to signify a lady.

In Daphne Du Maurier's novel Rebecca, the character of Rebecca is associated with "blood red" rhododendrons throughout the novel, perhaps due to the toxic roots of the plant mirroring the poisonous character of Rebecca. On the other hand, azaleas (a type of rhododendron) represent the second Mrs. De Winter.

In the young adult novel Walk Two Moons by Sharon Creech, the protagonist, Sal, and her friend, Phoebe, construct an elaborate story in which they suspect Phoebe's neighbor of murdering her husband and burying his body beneath a rhododendron in her yard.  Chapter 14 of the book is entitled "The Rhododendron".

Culinary
The rhododendron is the national flower of Nepal, where the flower is considered edible and enjoyed for its sour taste. The pickled flower can last for months and the flower juice is also marketed. The flower, fresh or dried, is added to fish curry in the belief that it will soften the bones. The juice of rhododendron flower is used to make a squash called burans (named after the flower) in the hilly regions of Uttarakhand. It is admired for its distinctive flavor and color.

Labrador tea

The herbal tea called Labrador tea (not a true tea) is made from one of three closely related species: 
 Rhododendron tomentosum (Northern Labrador tea, previously Ledum palustre) 
 Rhododendron groenlandicum, (Bog Labrador tea, previously Ledum groenlandicum or Ledum latifolium)
 Rhododendron neoglandulosum, (Western Labrador tea, or trapper's tea, previously Ledum glandulosum)

Conservation
In the UK the forerunner of the Rhododendron, Camellia and Magnolia Group (RCMG), The Rhododendron Society was founded in 1916. while in Scotland species are being conserved by the Rhododendron Species Conservation Group.

See also
 List of Award of Garden Merit rhododendrons
 List of Rhododendron diseases
 List of Rhododendron species
 List of Sections in Subgenus Rhododendron

References

Bibliography

Books and book chapters
  (also available online at Gallica)
 
 
 
  In four volumes: Vol. I. Lepidotes , Vol. II. Elepidotes. Arboreum-Lacteum , Vol. III. Elepidotes Continued, Neriiflorum-Thomsonii, Azaleastrum and Camtschaticum , Vol. IV. Azaleas .
 .

Articles

Subdivisions

Azaleas

Tsutsusi

Vireya
 . A reprint from Flora Malesiana ser. I, vol. 6, part 4. Pages 473 through 674. 
 
 
 
  Yearbook of the Rhododendron Species Foundation, Federal Way, WA.

Separate genera

Additional resources
Records of the Rhododendron Society of America reside at the Albert and Shirley Small Special Collections Library at the University of Virginia.

External links

 History of Rhododendron Discovery & Culture
 Rhododendrons from Turkey, Anatolia
 Danish Genebank Rhododendron
 Danish Genebank. Rhododendron in different countries
 German Genebank Rhododendron 
 Description of damage caused by Rhododendrons in the UK
 Information on rhododendrons at the Ericaceae web pages of Dr. Kron at Wake Forest University.
 Information on Vireyas
 Information+photos of hybrids and species
 Information on Rhododendrons by Marc Colombel, founder of the Société Bretonne du Rhododendron.
 Extensive information on rhododendron species: the history of their discovery, botanical details, toxicity, classification, cultural conditions, care for common problems, and suggestions for companion plants by Steve Henning.
 History of Rhododendrons
 Rhododendron in botanical garden Pruhonice-Czech republic

Databases
 USDA Plants Database: Rhododendron
 ITIS Report: Rhododendron
 eFloras.org
 Flora of North America: Rhododendron
 Flora of China: Rhododendron
 Annotated Checklist of the Flowering Plants of Nepal: Rhododendron

Societies
 American Rhododendron Society
 The Quarterly Bulletin of the American Rhododendron Society 1947–1981
 Journal of the American Rhododendron Society (JARS) 1982–
  Information Source: .
 The Rhododendron, Camellia & Magnolia Group of the Royal Horticultural Society
 Rhododendron Species Foundation and Botanical Garden
 Société Finlandaise du Rhododendron
 Australian Rhododendron Society
 German Rhododendron Society
 New Zealand Rhododendron Association
 Danish Rhododendron Society
 Fraser South Rhododendron Society

Botanical gardens
 Royal Botanic Garden Edinburgh: Rhododendrons at the four Gardens 
 National Rhododendron Gardens Melbourne Australia

 
Ericaceae genera
Plants used in traditional Chinese medicine
National symbols of Nepal
Taxa named by Carl Linnaeus
Extant Ypresian first appearances